The steam locomotives of Südbahn Class 23 (old) were goods train engines worked by the Austrian Southern Railway (österreichische Südbahn).

History
The precursors to the Austrian Southern Railway had a very disparate fleet of goods locomotives.
The Southern Railway therefore had a six-coupled freight locomotive developed which was based the French Bourbonnais prototype.
This series was initially given the designation 23, but was reclassified to 29 in 1864. The Lokomotivfabrik der StEG engine works delivered 20 units in 1860, which proved themselves so well that a total of 205 were built up to 1872 by this factory along with the Wiener Neustädter Lokomotivfabrik and Maschinenfabrik Esslingen.

Modifications
In the course of time there were naturally several modifications: in 1861 to the driver's cab, in the 1880s a vacuum brake with sound absorbers, new boilers, etc...

Dispersal
After nationalisation in 1924 the Federal Railway of Austria (BBÖ) took over 47 units, that were grouped into BBÖ Class 49. After the Second World War a few engines, classified by the Deutsche Reichsbahn as DRB 53.7111–7116, remained in Austria. Of these, the ÖBB only took over number 153.7114 but withdrew it in 1953.

Yugoslavia
Yugoslavia designated the locomotives that it received as JŽ 124.

Hungary
In Hungary they became MÁV 332.

Italy
In Italy they became FS 193.
Locomotives in FS Class 193

Preservation
Amazingly, five of them are preserved.

During the 1920s the BBÖ sold several engines to the Graz-Köflacher Bahn (GKB). Three of them, built in 1860, were preserved alongside two other Class 23 :

 One of them, number GKB 671, is still working today, albeit with some small modifications such as compressed-air brakes thanks to the work of the Steirischen Eisenbahnfreunde (Styrian Railway Society). Built in 1860, the Austrian-made Südbahn Class 23 (old) locomotive on the Graz-Köflach railway (GKB), is the longest serving steam engine in the world. It is frequently on duty and is used to haul steam specials.
GKB 674 ex Südbahn 674, has been preserved by the Budapest transport museum and restored with its early roofless drivers cab.
GKB 680 now belongs to the German Museum of Technology in Berlin.
 Südbahn 718, used by Yugoslav railways, resides in the Slovenian Railway Museum. Built in 1861, was restored with Südbahn livery and an open-top cab.
 Südbahn 852, used by ÖBB until 1958, is awaiting restoration, tenderless, at heizhaus Strasshof.

See also 
 List of DRG locomotives and railbuses

References

Literature
 
 
 
 
 
 
 
 

Austrian Southern Railway Company steam locomotives
Steam locomotives of Hungary
0-6-0 locomotives
Railway locomotives introduced in 1860
Steam locomotives of Germany
Freight locomotives
Standard gauge locomotives of Austria
Standard gauge locomotives of Yugoslavia
Standard gauge locomotives of Hungary
Standard gauge locomotives of Italy
Standard gauge locomotives of Germany
C n2 locomotives
Lokomotivfabrik der StEG locomotives
Wiener Neustädter locomotives
Esslingen locomotives

it:Locomotiva SB 23